David Wayne Edwards (born April 18, 1956) is an American professional golfer who played on the PGA Tour from 1979–2005 and now plays on the Champions Tour. He is the younger brother of former PGA Tour professional, Danny Edwards.
 
Edwards was born in Neosho, Missouri. He attended Oklahoma State University in Stillwater, Oklahoma and was a distinguished member of the golf team — a first-team All-American his junior and senior years. Edwards and teammate, Lindy Miller, led the Cowboys to the 1976 and 1978 NCAA Championships. Edwards was the individual medalist at the 1978 tournament in his senior year. He turned pro later that same year and joined the PGA Tour in 1979.

Edwards had more than 65 top-10 finishes in PGA Tour events and won four times (the first one was a Championship he shared with his brother). His best finish in a major was T3 at The Masters in 1984. In 1987, he scored the only double eagle in Torrey Pines PGA tournament history with driver-driver to the 18th green in the third round of play. During his late forties, Edwards split his playing time between the PGA Tour and the Nationwide Tour as do so many golfers at that stage who are preparing for the Champions Tour.

Edwards became eligible for the Champions Tour in April 2006, and won his first title at the 3M Championship in August of that year.

Edwards lives in Edmond, Oklahoma. He is a serious pilot who flies his own plane to tournaments.

Professional wins (7)

PGA Tour wins (4)

PGA Tour playoff record (1–1)

Other wins (2)
1994 Oklahoma Open
1996 Oklahoma Open

Champions Tour wins (1)

Results in major championships

CUT = missed the half-way cut
"T" indicates a tie for a place

Summary

Most consecutive cuts made – 6 (1994 Masters – 1995 U.S. Open)
Longest streak of top-10s – 1

Results in The Players Championship

CUT = missed the halfway cut
"T" indicates a tie for a place

See also
Fall 1978 PGA Tour Qualifying School graduates
1999 PGA Tour Qualifying School graduates

References

External links

American male golfers
Oklahoma State Cowboys golfers
PGA Tour golfers
PGA Tour Champions golfers
Golfers from Missouri
Golfers from Oklahoma
People from Neosho, Missouri
Sportspeople from Edmond, Oklahoma
1956 births
Living people